Mohammad Hossein Ziaei is an Iranian football manager currently coaching Naft Gachsaran in the Azadegan League.

Club career
He played as a defender for Shahin F.C. and Tractor during the 1980s and played one season in Hungary for Vasas SC.

Coaching career

He started his coaching career, as coach of Tractor and currently coaches Saba Battery F.C. He was replaced by Rasoul Korbekandi in November 2009. He was caretaker head coach of Paykan in 2011.

References

Iranian footballers
Iranian football managers
Living people
Iranian expatriate footballers
Paykan F.C. managers
Tractor S.C. managers
Saba Qom F.C. managers
Association football defenders
Year of birth missing (living people)